The 2019 Brentwood Borough Council election took place on 2 May 2019 to elect members of Brentwood Borough Council in England. This was on the same day as other local elections.

Results summary

Ward results

Brentwood North

Brentwood South

Brentwood West

Brizes & Doddinghurst

Herongate, Ingrave & West Horndon

 
 

 

No Independent candidate as previous (-34.0).

Hutton East

 
 

 

No Independent candidate as previous (-9.6).

Hutton North

Ingatestone, Fryerning & Mountnessing

Pilgrims Hatch

Shenfield

Tipps Cross

Warley

References

2019
2019 English local elections